Im Sothy  (24 May 1947 – 8 December 2017) was a Cambodian politician. He belonged to the Cambodian People's Party and was elected to represent Kampong Cham in the National Assembly of Cambodia in 2003. He was the education minister until 2013.

References

1947 births
2017 deaths 
Cambodian People's Party politicians
Members of the National Assembly (Cambodia)
Government ministers of Cambodia
People from Kampong Cham province